Farhad Mazhar (born 9 August 1947) is a Bangladeshi poet, philosopher, writer, columnist, pharmacist, social and human rights activist, and environmentalist. He is one of the founders and the managing director of UBINIG.

Biography
Mazhar graduated with honours in pharmacy from the University of Dhaka in 1967 and worked as a pharmacist in New York City in the seventies and eighties. He also studied political economy in The New School for Social Research. He is the founding member and managing director of UBINIG (Policy Research for Development Alternative), a policy research and advocacy group in Bangladesh working as an integral part of  the  community with the grassroots people to strengthen common resistance against the dominant processes of globalisation as well as creating space for strategic negotiations whenever possible.

Since the early days of his intellectual career, Farhad Mazhar has always been committed to Karl Marx, particularly because of his analysis of capital and the formation of revolutionary subjects. His recent intellectual contribution is more concerned with the critical understanding of religion, spirituality and the question of class narratives in a post-colonial society.
He is virulently critical of the vulgar materialist reduction of Marx's contribution  as well as the teachings of  his revolutionary followers by the conventional left in Bangladesh. Mazhar argues for a new politics which is more informed by the experience of the failure of previous socialist projects and the recent developments in philosophy and politics. Beside being an accomplished poet, he is considered as the major radical thinker in Bangladesh.

After Mazhar had been arrested in 1995, Nadine Gordimer, Jacques Derrida and Mahasweta Devi wrote a letter in The New York Times saying,

Gayatri Chakravorty Spivak mentioned him in her lecture "Many Voices" while receiving the Kyoto Prize in Arts and Philosophy in 2012 saying, "The poet Farhad Mazhar, with whom I had formed a friendship in the seventies, introduced me to the practitioners at the devotional school of Lalan Shah Fakir, a 19th century grassroots theologian and minstrel composer of amazing depth and invention...Farhad has recently reminded me that I had counseled him to sink himself in Lalan. Yet I think of Lalan as his gift to me."

Following the 2013 Motijheel Shootings, Mazhar was one of the few public intellectuals within Bangladesh to challenge the government's disinformation campaign. and the liberal logic of massacre.
William Gomes has recently compared Farhad Mazhar with Maulana Abdul Hamid Khan Bhashani and said, "Farhad Mazhar, who has continuously battled against the current fascistic regime with tolerates no dissent and demands absolute loyalty from the local press corps. He very recently stand alone against the covered-up massacre in Dhaka, where unarmed protesters were allegedly extrajudicially killed by the law enforcement agencies as they meditated and slept in the early hours on May 6th under cover of darkness."

Criticism
Salimullah Khan criticized him for inciting violence before and after 2014 Bangladeshi general election.

Abduction
Mazhar was found on a bus after his family had reported him missing. He sparked a police hunt after leaving his Dhaka home on Monday morning. There were reports of a ransom demand. Police said Mr Mazhar was eventually found on a bus travelling to the capital from the south-western city of Khulna. It was unclear if he had been abducted.

Bibliography

Prose

 Prastab (Proposal, 1976)
 Sashastra Ganaabhyutthan Ebang Ganatantrik Rashtrer Utthan Prasange (On Armed Mass Revolt and the Rise of Democratic State, 1985)
 Rajkumari Hasina (Princess Hasina, 1995)
 Sainjir Dainya Gan (2000)
 Jagadish (2002)
 Samna Samni: Farhad Mazharer Sange Kathabarta (2004)
 Banijya O Bangladesher Janagan (2004)
 Mokabila (2006)
 Ganapratiraksha (2006)
 Kshamatar Bikar O Ganashaktir Udbodhan (2007)
 Purushtantra O Nari (2008)
 Bhabandolan (2008)
 Samrajyabad (Imperialism, 2008)
 Rakter Dag Muchhe Rabindrapath (2008)
 Sambidhan O Ganatantra (Constitution and Democracy, 2008)
 Nirbachita Prabandha (Selected Essays, 2008)
 Crossfire: Rashtrer Rajnaitik Hatyakanda (Crossfire: Political Carnage by the State, 2008)
 Jacques Derrida-r Chihna Bichar (2010)
 Timir Janya Logicbidya (2011)
 Pran O Prakriti (Life and Nature, 2011)
 Marx Pather Bhoomika (An Introduction to the Study of Marx, 2011)
 Jaruri Abastha: Rashtra O Rajneeti (2012)
 Digital Fascibad (Digital Fascism, 2012)
 Yuddha Aro Kathin Aro Gabheer (2014)
 Byakti Bandhutwa O Sahitya (2016)
 Marx, Foucault O Ruhaniyat (Marx, Foucault and Spirituality, 2018)

Poetry

 Khokan Ebang Tar Pratipurush (The Dear Boy and His Representative, 1972)
 Tribhanger Tinti Jyamiti (Three Geometries of the Ill-shaped Man, 1977)
 Amake Tumi Danr Kariye Diyechho Biplaber Samne (You Have Pushed Me Towards Revolution, 1983)
 Lieutenant General Truck (1984)
 Subhakusum Dui Pharma (1985)
 Briksha (The Tree, 1985)
 Akasmat Raptanimukhi Narimachine (1985)
 Khasra Gadya (1987)
 Meghmachiner Sangeet (1988)
 Asamayer Noteboi (1994)
 Daradi Bakul (1994)
 Gubre Pokar Shwashur (2000)
 Kabitar Boner Sange Abar (2003)
 Cameragiri (2010)
 Shreshtha Kabita (2010)
 Ebadatnama (2011)
 E Samayer Kabita (2011)
 Je Tumi Rang Dekhoni (2011)
 Kabitasangraha (2011)
 Tumi Chhara Ar Kon Shalare Ami Care Kari (2016)
 Sadaruddin (2018)

Plays
 Prajapatir Leelalasya (1972)

Translations
 Arthashastra Paryalochanar Ekti Bhoomika (2010) (Translation of A Contribution to the Critique of Political Economy by Karl Marx, 1859)
 Khun Habar Dui Rakam Paddhati (2011) (Translation of Roque Dalton's poems)

References

Bangladeshi columnists
Bangladeshi male writers
University of Dhaka alumni
1947 births
Living people